Archive 81 is an American supernatural horror streaming television series developed by Rebecca Sonnenshine, who was also an executive producer for the show, along with Paul Harris Boardman and James Wan. The series was released on Netflix on January 14, 2022. Between January 9–30, the series was watched for 128.47 million hours globally according to Netflix Top 10s. However, in March 2022, the series was canceled after just one season.

The series is based on the podcast of the same name that began in 2016. Mamoudou Athie and Dina Shihabi star in leading roles as Dan and Melody. Dan is hired by a mysterious company to restore video footage of grad student Melody's documentary project on an apartment building that burned down.

Cast and characters

Main
 Mamoudou Athie as Dan Turner
 Dina Shihabi as Melody Pendras
 Evan Jonigkeit as Samuel Spare / Alexander Davenport
 Julia Chan as Anabelle Cho
 Ariana Neal as Jess Lewis
 Matt McGorry as Mark Higgins
 Martin Donovan as Virgil Davenport

Guest
 Charlie Hudson III as Steve Turner
 Kate Eastman as Tamara Stefano
 Eden Marryshow as John Smith
 Georgina Haig as Iris Vos
 Kristin Griffith as Cassandra Wall
 Emy Coligado as Helen Yung

Episodes

Production

Development
On October 26, 2020, it was announced that Rebecca Sonnenshine would be the executive producer and showrunner of a horror television series for Netflix and Atomic Monster, with Paul Harris Boardman as writer and executive producer, and James Wan also executive producing. The series was inspired by the podcast of the same name. On January 5, 2022, it was reported that Michael Clear, Rebecca Thomas, and Antoine Douaihy were executive producing the series as well. Archive 81 was released on January 14, 2022, on Netflix. On March 24, 2022, Netflix canceled the series after one season.

Casting
Along with the announcement, Mamoudou Athie and Dina Shihabi were cast in the series. In November that same year, Martin Donovan, Matt McGorry, Julia Chan, Evan Jonigkeit, and Ariana Neal joined the cast.

Filming
Principal photography began on November 16, 2020, and concluded on March 29, 2021, in Pittsburgh, Pennsylvania, with Rebecca Thomas directing half of the series.

Reception
The review aggregator website Rotten Tomatoes reported an 85% approval rating with an average rating of 7.1/10, based on 34 critic reviews. The website's critics' consensus reads, "An intriguing blend of horror and noir, Archive 81 offers addictive supernatural thrills that are haunting in the best way." Metacritic, which uses a weighted average, assigned a score of 73 out of 100 based on 16 critics, indicating "generally favorable reviews".

When the show debuted, it broke into the Nielsen streaming rankings at number seven, and it reached as high as number two in its second week.

References

External links
 
 

2020s American drama television series
2020s American horror television series
2020s American mystery television series
2020s American supernatural television series
2022 American television series debuts
2022 American television series endings
Demons in television
English-language Netflix original programming
Found footage fiction
Horror drama television series
Lovecraftian horror
Television series about cults
Television series about witchcraft
Television shows based on podcasts
Television shows filmed in Pittsburgh
Television shows set in New York City
Television series set in 1924
Television series set in 1994
Television series set in 2019